DNA is the seventh studio album by American rock band Trapt, released on August 19, 2016. The album's recording was partly funded by a 2014 campaign on Indiegogo. The band was originally set to release the album in 2015. Best Buy offered a limited edition, which included the two bonus tracks "Panic Room" and "Chasing Highs", as well as the front cover of the insert sleeve being autographed by the band. DNA became Trapt's first album since Amalgamation to miss the top 100 on the US Billboard 200, peaking at number 148, selling only 4,500 copies in its first week.

Track listing

Charts

References

2016 albums
Trapt albums